Space Ship One is the seventh studio album by Paul Gilbert, best known as the guitarist of the hard rock band Mr. Big and formerly of Racer X. It was released in 2005.

Track listing
All songs written by Paul Gilbert, except where noted:

 Track 13 originally recorded by the Beatles on the album Yellow Submarine.

Musicians
 Paul Gilbert – guitar, vocals
 Linus of Hollywood – bass guitar
 Marco Minnemann – drums

Production
 Larry Freemantle – art direction
 Steve Hall – mastering
 William Hames – photography
 Tim Size – engineer
 Tim Heyne – management

References

Paul Gilbert albums
2005 albums
Shrapnel Records albums